Reverse telnet is a specialized application of telnet, where the server side of the connection reads and writes data to a computer terminal line (RS-232 serial port), rather than providing a command shell to the host device.  Typically, reverse telnet is implemented on an embedded device (e.g. terminal/console server), which has an Ethernet network interface and serial port(s).  Through the use of reverse telnet on such a device, IP-networked users can use telnet to access serially-connected devices.  

In the past, reverse telnet was typically used to connect to modems or other external asynchronous devices. Today, reverse telnet is used mostly for connecting to the console port of a router, a switch or other device.

Example
On the client, the command line for initiating a "reverse telnet" connection might look like this: 

telnet 172.16.1.254 2002

(The syntax in the above example would be valid for the command-line telnet client packaged with many operating systems, including most Unix operating systems, or available as an option or add-on.)

In this example, 172.16.1.254 is the IP address of the console device, and 2002 is the TCP port associated with a terminal line on the server.

See also
 Terminal server
 Console server

Internet protocols
Internet Protocol based network software
Telnet
Unix network-related software
Out-of-band management